Curtis Davies (born 17 January 1997) is a Welsh professional rugby league footballer who plays as a hooker for Newcastle Thunder in the Betfred Championship and Wales at international level.

Background
His full-time job is a physical education teacher at Crossley Heath Grammar school.

His twin brother Connor Davies also plays professional rugby league.

Playing career
In 2018 he made his professional debut for Halifax against the London Broncos in Round 7 of the Super League Qualifiers.

International career
He was selected in the Wales 9s squad for the 2019 Rugby League World Cup 9s.

References

External links
Halifax profile
Wales profile
Welsh profile

1997 births
Living people
Halifax R.L.F.C. players
Newcastle Thunder players
Rugby league locks
Rugby league players from Swansea
Villeneuve Leopards players
Wales national rugby league team players
Welsh rugby league players
Welsh schoolteachers
Whitehaven R.L.F.C. players
Workington Town players